Oskar Neynaber was a German fishing trawler that was requisitioned in the Second World War by the Kriegsmarine for use as a vorpostenboot, serving as V 308 Oskar Neynaber. She was torpedoed and sunk by Soviet Navy motor torpedo boats on 23 September 1941.

Description
The engine was made by Christiansen & Meyer, Harburg, Germany. It was rated at 57 nhp. The engine powered a single screw propeller.

History
Oscar Neynaber was built as yard number 241 by Schiffsbau Gesellschaft Unterweser AG, Unterweser-Lehe, Germany for the Kohlenbert & Putz Seefischerei AG, Wesermünde. She was launhced on 30 October 1929 and completed on 20 November. The fishing boat registration PG 390 was allocated, as were the Code Letters KRVS. In 1934, her code Letters were changed to DFBC.

On 17 September 1939, she was requisitioned by the Kriegsmarine for use as a vorpostenboot, She was allocated to 3 Vorpostenflotille, serving as V 308 Oscar Neynaber.

References

Sources

1929 ships
Ships built in Bremen (state)
Fishing vessels of Germany
Steamships of Germany
World War II merchant ships of Germany
Auxiliary ships of the Kriegsmarine
Maritime incidents in September 1941
World War II shipwrecks in the Baltic Sea